The St. Joseph School is located in Beeramangala of Sullia town on the campus of St. Brigid Church. It was  established in 2000. It is regarded as one of the best schools in Sullia.

Current Correspondent : Rev. Father Victor D'Souza ( as of 2022/2023).

Current Headmistress : Sr. Binoma ( as of 2022/2023)

Sub-Headmistress : Sr Stella ( as of 2022/2023 )

Description
Classes are offered from pre-kindergarten to Secondary School Leaving Certificate (SSLC).  The school is maintained under the management of the Catholic Board of Education in Mangalore. The school presently has 28 teachers and nearly 1000 students. Sr. Binomma is serving as headmistress for high school and higher primary school respectively. Fr.Valerian Lewis has founded high school in 2007. This school provides many facilities for children.

Christian schools in Karnataka
High schools and secondary schools in Karnataka
Schools in Dakshina Kannada district
Educational institutions established in 2000
2000 establishments in Karnataka